USS Shipley Bay (CVE-85) was a  of the United States Navy. She was named after Shipley Bay, located within Kosciusko Island. The bay in turn was named after Ensign John H. Shipley, an officer on the ship surveying the Alexander Archipelago. Launched in February 1944, and commissioned in March 1944, she served in support of the Battle of Okinawa. Postwar, she participated in Operation Magic Carpet. She was decommissioned in June 1946, when she was mothballed in the Atlantic Reserve Fleet. Ultimately, she was sold for scrapping in October 1959.

Design and description

Shipley Bay was a Casablanca-class escort carrier, the most numerous type of aircraft carriers ever built, and designed specifically to be mass-produced using prefabricated sections, in order to replace heavy early war losses. She displaced  standard,  with a full load. She was powered with two Skinner Unaflow reciprocating steam engines, which drove two shafts, providing , thus enabling her to make . Her compact size necessitated the installment of an aircraft catapult at her bow, and there were two aircraft elevators to facilitate movement of aircraft between the flight and hangar deck: one each fore and aft.

One /38 caliber dual-purpose gun was mounted on the stern. Anti-aircraft defense was provided by 8 Bofors  anti-aircraft guns in single mounts, as well as 12 Oerlikon  cannons, which were mounted around the perimeter of the deck. By the end of the war, Casablanca-class carriers had been modified to carry thirty 20-mm cannons, and the amount of 40-mm guns had been doubled to sixteen, by putting them into twin mounts. These modifications were in response to increasing casualties due to kamikaze attacks. Casablanca-class escort carriers were designed to carry 27 aircraft, but the hangar deck could accommodate more.

Construction
The escort carrier was laid down on 22 November 1943, under a Maritime Commission contract, MC hull 1122, by Kaiser Shipbuilding Company, Vancouver, Washington. She was named Shipley Bay, which in turn was named after Ensign John H. Shipley, who  assisted in surveying the Alexander Archipelago. Her naming was part of a tradition which named escort carriers after bays or sounds in Alaska. She was launched on 12 February 1944; sponsored by Mrs. Lawrence B. Richardson; transferred to the United States Navy and commissioned on 21 March 1944, with Captain Edgar Tilghman Neale in command.

Service history

Upon being commissioned, Shipley Bay underwent a shakedown cruise down the West Coast to San Diego. She operated off the Southern California coast until 3 May, when she took on a load of aircraft and personnel, and ferried them to Pearl Harbor and stops in the South Pacific. She conducted these transport missions until October, making stops at the West Coast, Pearl Harbor, Majuro Atoll, Guadalcanal, and Tulagi. In these missions, she ferried a total of 496 aircraft.

After finishing her aircraft deliveries, she was designated the role of a replacement carrier, carrying aircraft to replenish battlefield losses. She was assigned to Task Group 30.8 within Task Force 38, and maintained a backline, supply role. In three meetings, she transferred a total of 100 aircraft to frontline carriers.

After finishing her duties as a replacement carrier for the Philippines campaign, she operated off of Pearl Harbor as a training carrier for the next three months. During her tenure as a replacement carrier, Captain Austin Wadsworth Wheelock took over as commanding officer of the ship. On 22 April, she departed Pearl Harbor, bound for Okinawa. Stopping at Guam, she arrived on 7 May and immediately began operations. Between 7 May and 16 May, her aircraft conducted 352 sorties supporting the Battle of Okinawa, bombing Japanese defenses and equipment. On 16 May, her aviation gasoline tanks were damaged by a collision, forcing her to retire back to Guam for repairs.
 
Once repairs were finished, she once again returned to the waters off of Okinawa, along with five other escort carriers. She resumed operations on 9 June, and her aircraft were assigned the duty of neutralizing the five airfields on Miyako-jima and Ishigaki-jima, from which kamikaze aircraft were operating. She bombed the airfields between 14 and 16 June, returning again from 18 to 22 June. On 22 June, she left, bound for the West Coast, where she would undergo overhaul. She was moored at U.S. Repair Base, San Diego when the Japanese surrender was announced.

On 26 September, she left San Diego, and joined the "Magic Carpet" fleet, which repatriated U.S. servicemen from throughout the Pacific. She cruised around the Pacific, making stops at San Francisco, Pearl Harbor, Okinawa, and Kwajalein, ultimately returning several thousand troops back to the United States.

Shipley Bay sailed to Boston, Massachusetts in February 1946 in order to undergo deactivation, arriving on 9 March. She was decommissioned on 28 June 1946, and mothballed in the Atlantic Reserve Fleet at South Boston Naval Annex. On 12 June 1955, she was redesignated as a utility aircraft carrier, CVU-85. She was struck from the Navy list on 1 March 1959, and sold for scrap on 2 October. She was towed to Japan, where she was broken up throughout January 1961. She received two battle stars for her World War II service.

References

Sources

Online sources

Bibliography

External links 

 

 

Casablanca-class escort carriers
World War II escort aircraft carriers of the United States
Ships built in Vancouver, Washington
1943 ships
S4-S2-BB3 ships